Robert or Bob Hudson may refer to:

Robert Hudson, 1st Viscount Hudson (1886–1957), British politician and son of Robert William Hudson
Robert Hudson (actor) (born 1960), British actor
Robert Hudson (broadcaster) (1920–2010), British broadcaster on cricket, rugby and state occasions
Robert Hudson (company), defunct British manufacturer and supplier of railway rolling stock and equipment
Robert Hudson (FRS) (1801–1883), English naturalist
Robert Hudson (novelist) (born 1973), British novelist and comedy writer
Robert Hudson (producer) (born 1960), American documentary filmmaker and Academy Award winner
Robert George Spencer Hudson (1895–1965), British geologist and paleontologist
Robert A. Hudson (1887–1974), American business executive and golf enthusiast
Robert H. Hudson (born 1938), American artist
Robert James Hudson (1885–1963), Governor of Southern Rhodesia
Robert Spear Hudson (1812–1884), popularised dry soap powder
Robert William Hudson (1856–1937), soap manufacturer and son of Robert Spear Hudson
Bob Hudson (offensive lineman) (born 1930), American football player
Bob Hudson (running back) (born 1948), American football player
Bob Hudson (singer), Australian singer and radio presenter

See also
Rob Hudson (born 1955), Australian politician
Robert B. Mantell (1854–1928), Scottish-born actor, sometimes used the acting name Robert Hudson

Hudson, Robert